Thomas Vivien Colin Hardwick (born 24 March 1999) is an English professional rugby union player, currently unattached the last club he played for was SC Albi, who play in France's third national division of rugby union. He previously played 32 games for Leicester Tigers between 2017 and 2021. He usually plays fly half or centre.

Early life and education
Hardwick's father is former  prop Rob Hardwick.

Hardwick played initially at Bedford Junior Blues and Olney RFC. He went to Bedford Modern School and sixth form at Rugby School, and represented England junior age groups.

Rugby playing career
Hardwick made his debut for Leicester Tigers on 10 November 2017 in an Anglo-Welsh Cup match against Bath at the Rec, he scored 11 points as Leicester lost 33 – 31. 

Hardwick was named in the England under 20s squad for the 2018 World Rugby Under 20 Championship. He scored a try in the semi final win over South Africa, and played in the final, a 25 – 33 loss to France.

On 11 March 2021 he was released by Leicester.<ref>24 July 2021 his signing was announced by SC Albi, a club in France's Championnat Fédéral Nationale, For the start of the 2022/23 Season Hardwick signed for Ampthill in the English Championship.

References

1999 births
Living people
English rugby union players
Leicester Tigers players
Rugby union fly-halves
Rugby union players from Chertsey